Maik Baier (born 20 June 1989 in Bietigheim-Bissingen) is a German racing cyclist who represents Germany in BMX. He was selected to represent Germany at the 2012 Summer Olympics in the men's BMX event, where he finished in 29th place.

References

External links
 
 
 
 

1989 births
Living people
BMX riders
German male cyclists
Olympic cyclists of Germany
Cyclists at the 2012 Summer Olympics
People from Bietigheim-Bissingen
Sportspeople from Stuttgart (region)
Cyclists from Baden-Württemberg